Gopichand is a 1958 Bollywood film directed by Ishwarlal, starring Shyama and Shahu Modak.

Soundtrack

References

External links
 

1958 films
1950s Hindi-language films
Films scored by Avinash Vyas